The 1989 Southwest Conference men's basketball tournament was held March 11–0, 1989, at Reunion Arena in Dallas, Texas. 

Number 1 seed Arkansas defeated 2 seed Texas 100-76 to win their 4th championship and receive the conference's automatic bid to the 1989 NCAA tournament.

Format and seeding 
The tournament consisted of the top 8 teams playing in a single-elimination tournament.

Tournament

References 

1988–89 Southwest Conference men's basketball season
Basketball in the Dallas–Fort Worth metroplex
Southwest Conference men's basketball tournament